Meirambek Ainagulov (also spelled Mirambek, born 17 February 1994) is a Kazakhstani sport wrestler who competes in the men's Greco Roman category. He has claimed two medals at the World Wrestling Championships, silver medal in the men's 59 kg event in 2017 and bronze medal in the men's 60 kg event. He was qualified to represent Kazakhstan at the 2020 Summer Olympics following his medal success at the 2019 World Wrestling Championships.

References

External links
 
 
 

1994 births
Living people
Kazakhstani male sport wrestlers
World Wrestling Championships medalists
Wrestlers at the 2018 Asian Games
Asian Games bronze medalists for Kazakhstan
Asian Games medalists in wrestling
Medalists at the 2018 Asian Games
People from Aktobe
Asian Wrestling Championships medalists
Wrestlers at the 2020 Summer Olympics
Olympic wrestlers of Kazakhstan